The former Ashford & Sons factory in Birmingham, England is a Grade II* listed building in Arts & Crafts style.

The factory, at 16-18 Great Hampton Street in the city's Jewellery Quarter, in the Hockley district, was designed by local architect Arthur McKewan and completed in 1912.

It was given Grade II* listed status in 1982, protecting it from unauthorised development or deletion. The list entry describes it as:

In June 2016, plans to convert the then-empty building into 64 one-bedroom, 77 two-bedroom and six three-bedroom residential apartments were announced.

Ashford & Sons 

John Ashford was a gilt toy maker ("toy" meaning small items like buckles and buttons, not children's playthings) in Birmingham from 1842. In 1905 he sold the business to Joseph Aitken. The firm, which made enamelled objects and men's jewellery, closed in 1980, but its name is still shown, carved in Portland stone on the building's frontage.

References

External links 

 

Grade II* listed buildings in Birmingham
Buildings and structures completed in 1912
Arts and Crafts architecture in England
Grade II* listed industrial buildings